Ourmes (also written Ourmas) is a town and commune in Guemar District, El Oued Province, Algeria. According to the 2008 census it has a population of 5,900, up from 5,059 in 1998, with an annual growth rate of 1.6%.

Climate

Ourmes has a hot desert climate (Köppen climate classification BWh), with very hot summers and mild winters. Rainfall is light and sporadic, and summers are particularly dry.

Education

4.9% of the population has a tertiary education, and another 12.7% has completed secondary education. The overall literacy rate is 79.7%, and is 86.0% among males and 73.3% among females.

Localities
The commune of Ourmes is composed of three localities:

Ourmés
Hadhoudi
Legouiret

References

Neighbouring towns and cities

Communes of El Oued Province
Cities in Algeria
Algeria